Xyroptila irina is a moth of the family Pterophoridae which is endemic to Madagascar.

References

De Prins, J. & De Prins, W. 2016. Afromoths, online database of Afrotropical moth species (Lepidoptera). World Wide Web electronic publication (www.afromoths.net) (acc.08-Jan-2017)

External links

Moths described in 2006
Endemic fauna of Madagascar
Moths of Africa
irina